Tariq Onyedika E. Uwakwe (born 19 November 1999) is an English professional footballer who plays as a midfielder for League 2 club Crewe Alexandra.

Early life 
Uwakwe was born in Islington, London and is of Nigerian descent.

Club career
Uwakwe began his career at Chelsea, after joining at the age of 8, and signed on loan for Accrington Stanley in September 2020. He made his Accrington debut on 8 September 2020, in an EFL Trophy tie against Leeds United U21s, and scored a hat-trick in the process. He made his league debut four days later against Peterborough United, scoring a goal.

On 28 January 2022, Uwakwe joined EFL League One side Crewe Alexandra on an 18-month contract, and made his debut in Crewe's 1–0 league defeat at Gillingham on 1 February 2022. On his fifth appearance for Crewe, against Oxford United, he suffered a knee injury, ruling him out for several weeks. He scored his first Crewe goal in a 2-2 draw at Harrogate Town on 18 February 2023.

International career
Uwakwe has represented England at under-18, under-19 and under-20 youth levels.

Career statistics

References

1999 births
Living people
English footballers
Chelsea F.C. players
Accrington Stanley F.C. players
Crewe Alexandra F.C. players
Association football midfielders
English Football League players
Footballers from Greater London
England youth international footballers
People from Islington (district)
English people of Nigerian descent
Black British sportspeople